Blaze and the Monster Machines is a computer-animated interactive children's television series with a focus on teaching science, technology, engineering, and mathematics (STEM) that premiered on Nickelodeon on October 13, 2014. The series revolves around Blaze, a monster truck, and his driver, AJ, as they have adventures in Axle City and learn about various STEM concepts which help them on their way. Joining them is the human mechanic Gabby and their monster truck friends Stripes, Starla, Darington and Zeg as well as their rival Crusher and his sidekick Pickle. Then later on, Watts join the main cast in Season 3.

Plot
Blaze and the Monster Machines focuses on Blaze, a red monster truck, and his smart young driver, AJ. They live in a world that involves many living monster trucks called "Monster Machines". Their friends include their truck friends, Starla, Stripes, Zeg, Darington, and Watts (as of Season 3), as well as Gabby, who is a mechanic who can fix anything and later on Watts' Monster Machine driver and close friend (as of Season 3). Each episode also features Crusher, a sneaky blue truck who cheats in races, but slowly evolves into a nicer character. Crusher is always accompanied by a small truck named Pickle, his goofy sidekick.

Format
Each episode has Blaze and AJ go on various adventures and solve problems along the way, normally three per episode, with "assistance" from the viewing audience. Blaze might also transform into a different vehicle or artifact depending on the situation. Blaze may sometimes get a task done with the help of his Blazing Speed, a special power that allows him to go super fast. Animals in this monster machine world have blended windows (which have been removed as of season 5) and wheels. However, AJ and Gabby are both humans. In some episodes, Blaze, AJ and their friends are in a race against Crusher. During the race, Crusher cheats, usually with the help of his gray robot parts. However, Blaze and AJ manage to get through his traps, and they always beat him in time. Some episodes do not involve races, but still have Blaze competing against Crusher, sometimes by racing against him to get an item. Other episodes involve helping a truck friend such as Starla, Zeg, Darington, Stripes, Watts, or even Crusher and/or Pickle. Each episode features two or three original songs usually performed by Blaze and AJ offscreen, when they're setting off on their adventure or demonstrating the episode's STEM concept.

Episodes

Characters

Main
 Blaze (voiced by Nolan North) is the show's host and central character, an orange-red monster truck with blue eyes and a flame emblem, who is good-hearted, loyal, and brave. He seems to be based on the first-generation 2010-2014 Ford F-150 SVT Raptor, judging from the coinciding orange-red color. He is Axle City's number one racer, especially with help from his Blazing Speed which is initiated by saying "Let's Blaze!" At the start of Season 2, Blaze becomes the newest member of the Axle City Fire Department and Season 4 has him join the Axle City Police Department to help Officer Anna. In the Season 5 episode "The Blaze Family," Blaze has a family: a mother, a father and a little sister named Sparkle. He and his friends would also visit VelocityVille (where they turn into Race Cars to take part in adventures and Race Car Events) and Animal Island (to visit their animal friends and transform into animals for competitions or to take care of problems and/or obstacles). As revealed in the Season 3 episode "Need for Blazing Speed," Blaze's Blazing Speed engine is not only what he uses to unleash his Blazing Speed, but it is also what allows him to drive around in general. As of Season 3, starting with the "Wild Wheels" episodes, Blaze's design has been slightly upgraded to have the addition of taillights, coinciding with the series' updated animation. Blaze, along with his Monster Machine friends and Gabby's ATV, also have additional features as well, such as grappling lines to tow fellow Monster Machines out of trouble and Speed Lights to illuminate themselves in the dark and race in the dark in one of Axle City's outdoor race tracks. On his tires, he has flame patterns.
 AJ (voiced by Dusan Brown in "Blaze of Glory" through "Dragon Island Duel", Caleel Harris in "Runaway Rocket" through Season 3, Ramone Hamilton in Season 4 through "The Amazing Stunt Kitty" and Jakari Fraser in "Sir Blaze and the Unicorn" through present; singing by Jacquez Swanigan in "The Mystery Bandit" through "Rocket Ski Rescue", Reed L. Shannon in "Race to Eagle Rock" through "The Gold Medal Games" and Artyon Celestine in "Sparkles Racing Badge" through present) is the show's co-host and Blaze's human best friend and driver. He is a science and technology expert who has light brown skin, brown eyes and brown hair, and wears a white and red racing suit and helmet. AJ's racing suit technology includes his Visor View in his helmet which allows him to see things no one else can. When AJ activates his Visor View, the background usually turns orange in Season 1. From Season 2 and onwards, it doesn't do that anymore. His skywriting gloves which allow him to draw pictures in mid-air (which has been mostly abandoned since Season 3) and a wrist-com video watch worn on his left arm to call others. His uniform can also undergo minor changes in appearance, such as when Blaze transforms into a race car, and Blaze using his speed lights. As the show progressed, AJ become the one to describe the STEM concept instead of Blaze in earlier seasons.
 Crusher (voiced by Kevin Michael Richardson) is a deep blue monster truck with a lighter blue lightning bolt motif who is Blaze and AJ's rival. He resembles a large 18-wheeler cargo-truck, such as a Peterbilt 386 or Kenworth T680. He cheats in most episodes because he would get lampooned by Blaze in a fair race. He constructs various cheating gadgets from parts that he keeps in a bag on his chassis. While he is known for his cheating and mischievous ways, he is not all bad and not really evil. In fact, there are times where Crusher is still good at heart at times. In addition, Blaze and his friends are even willing to help Crusher in some instances, such as helping him find his toy truck «Little Trucky,» Gasqautch saving him by sneezing away a thundercloud and then bringing him down from Mud Mountain, Gabby fixing his muffler/exhaust pipe when it got broken, Blaze saving him and Pickle when they got stuck in a snowball, Blaze saving him and Pickle on a rocket or a hot air balloon, Blaze and Grammy saving him when his rocket skis got a malfunction in “Rocket Ski Rescue” and Blaze helped convince Crusher not to cheat when they've teamed up in a Team Truck Challenge in “Defeat the Cheat.” In fact, in the race, Crusher finally scored himself his first ever win fair and square and it is also the first time where Crusher's running gag does not end with Crusher disgusted. It actually ends with Crusher being happy (as Crusher did bump into an ice cream cart and ended up messy, but happy about his win. He happily eats the dripping ice cream as he says, "Tastes like Winning!"). On his tires, he has lightning bolt patterns.
 Pickle (voiced by Nat Faxon) is a small green singing hatchback monster car truck based on an AMC Eagle with darker green stripes and bumps on his sides, who is Crusher's sidekick despite Crusher's indifference towards him, although the two are known to be close friends most of the time. In the Season 4 episode "The Pickle Family Campout," he has a family: three cousins, five sisters, and Grandpa. He tends to look on the brighter side of things and is quite goofy and has an extremely high pitch voice. Although he is by Crusher's side, Pickle is actually quite friendly towards Blaze and his friends. On his tires, he has wavy line patterns.
 Gabby (voiced by Angelina Wahler in Season 1 through "Tow Truck Tough", Molly Jackson in "Need for Blazing Speed" through Season 5 and Luna Bella Zamora in Season 6 through present) is a knowledgeable human mechanic with light skin, blue eyes and purple hair in a ponytail and wears a white shirt with blue overalls, though she switches to a white and blue racing suit and helmet with goggles when riding with Blaze. She fixes up the trucks when they are damaged and sometimes rides with AJ and Blaze to take part in some of their adventures. Gabby's uniform and helmet undergoes changes like AJ's, but it has only happened once (when Gabby's ATV uses Speed Lights). Gabby also drives a purple ATV. However, she no longer drives it anymore after "Light Riders" because starting with "Fast Friends", she is now a Monster Machine driver for Watts. This makes her the second character to become one and to be partnered with a Monster Machine (in this case: Watts), the first being AJ who partners with Blaze. When Gabby competes in a Monster Machine event with Watts, she wears a white and magenta version of her racing suit.
 Stripes (voiced by Sunil Malhotra) is a yellow-orange and violet striped truck with the abilities of a tiger based off a Jeep Wrangler, such as a high sense of smell and retractable spike-claws in his tires. He is good at jumping and climbing. In season 3's "Wild Wheels" episodes, when Blaze transforms into a Lion Monster Machine, he shares his engineering powers to transform Stripes into a tiger named Super Tiger Stripes. In "Babysitting Heroes," it reveals that Stripes can babysit baby animals. His home is a treehouse in a jungle outside Axle City. On his tires, he has stripe patterns. In "The Monster Machine Christmas Extravaganza", he is an Axle City Caroler.
 Starla (voiced by Kate Higgins) is a purple pickup truck based on the then-all-new 2014 GMC Sierra (in Single Cab) with a sparkly silver cowgirl hat, who is a roping expert and speaks with a thick Southern accent. She runs a farm outside Axle City. She was the only female Monster Machine to be a main cast member until "Watts" in Season 3 (see below). On her tires, she has horseshoe patterns. In "The Monster Machine Christmas Extravaganza", she is an Axle City Caroler.
 Darington (voiced by Alexander Polinsky) is a clumsy yet fearless starry blue and white monster truck with a gold star motif based on a Toyota Tacoma, helmet and cape-like spoiler, who loves stunts, and often becomes happy. His catchphrase is "Daringtooooon!" In "The Chicken Circus," it is revealed that Darington can speak chicken. In "The Amazing Stunt Kitty," it is also revealed that Darington has a kitty cat named Stunt Kitty as his pet and sidekick. On his tires, he has star patterns. In "The Monster Machine Christmas Extravaganza", he is an Axle City Caroler.
 Zeg (voiced by James Patrick Stuart) is a light green and dark aqua half-dinosaur triceratops, half-monster truck with brute tendencyies based on a Audi Q5. He has a short vocabulary and tends to refer to himself in the third person. Like most ceratopside dinosaurs, Zeg likes to smash. In "Race to the Top of the World," Zeg reveals that he can't swim. He also has a low, Hulk-like voice. His home is a prehistoric cave outside Axle City. On his tires, he has rock patterns. In "The Monster Machine Christmas Extravaganza", he is an Axle City Caroler.
 Watts (voiced by Melanie Minichino) is a magenta Monster Machine powered by electricity who speaks with a South American accent and is the latest of Blaze's Monster Machine friends (as of Season 3) based on a Lamborghini Huracan LP610-4. She is also the second female Monster Machine to both be part of the main cast and be part of Blaze's Machine friends, with the first one being Starla. Watts' features include her electric engine and her special yellow electric tires, both allowing her to drive fast, and her Electric Charge which allows her to give anything electricity so it can work. When Watts met Blaze, AJ and Gabby for the first time, she happily asks Gabby to be her driver, saying that she never had anyone driving her before. Gabby happily accepts Watts' offer, saying that she has never been a Monster Machine's driver before. Since then, Gabby is now a Monster Machine driver for Watts and the two are now very close friends. This makes Watts the second Monster Machine to be driven by a human and to be partnered with a Monster Machine driver (in this case, Gabby) with the first being Blaze who partners with AJ. On her tires, she has lightning bolt patterns just like Crusher. In "The Monster Machine Christmas Extravaganza", she is an Axle City Caroler.

Recurring

Minor

Special guest stars

Locations
Axle City is the main location of the series and where Blaze, AJ, Gabby, and all of the rest of the Monster Machines live. The most well known locations of the area include the Monster Dome, Mud Mountain, a land of Medieval Monster Machines, and much more, including nearby islands. Monster Machines race events include Stuntmania, the Axle City Grand Prix and the Race to the Top of the World. Monster Machine friends, both in Axle City and other areas of the Monster Machine world, include the Great Sphinx, Pegwheel Pete and his Pirate Crew, Bump Bumperman, Joe and Gus, Gasquatch, the Light Thief (a kangaroo), the Litter Critter (a raccoon), and the Treat Thief (a mouse).
 VelocityVille is the location for the "Race Car Adventures" episodes. To reach VelocityVille, Blaze and his friends travel to it with help from their friend, Swoops, whom Blaze and AJ first met before he offers them a ride on their very first visit to VelocityVille. Where Axle City is inhabited by Monster Machines, VelocityVille's inhabitants are Race Cars. This is where Blaze transformed into a Race Car for first time to save his new friends of Velocityville and since then, he, his Monster Machine friends and even Crusher and Pickle transform into Race Cars whenever they visit VelocityVille. As a result of the Race Car Transformation, AJ's racing suit also undergoes some slight changes, such as his racing helmet having white detailing instead of black. Blaze, AJ, Gabby and the other Monster Machine's Race Car friends include Rally, Fender, Dash, Mark-Set-Go and other Velocityville residents like Becky Checkerflag and Speedrick (formerly a rival who wants no one to be faster than him, but now a friend who believes that all race cars, including him, should be fast). In VelocityVille, Race Cars happily drive around the city at incredible speed and velocity thanks to their aerodynamic shapes, and Race Car events take place, such as the Race to Eagle Rock, the Polar Derby and the Hundred Mile Race.
 Animal Island is a location in the Monster Machines' World where animals of all kinds reside, including insects. Animal Island is also the location for the "Wild Wheels" episodes. Unlike the animals in Axle City and VelocityVille, all of the animals in Animal Island are capable to talk like humans and Monster Machines, in addition to their usual animal noises. The main residents of the island and Blaze, AJ, Gabby and the Monster Machines' animal friends include Bunk the Elephant, Bam the Gorilla, Skyler the Falcon, Nelson the Rhino, and Tooks the Toucan. Blaze and his friends travel to Animal Island by raft or Swoops. When Blaze and his friends visit Animal Island, instead of STEM Concepts, the "Wild Wheels" episodes teach viewers educational facts about all kinds of Animals.

Production
The first season consisted of 20 episodes. On June 15, 2015, the series was renewed for a third season which premiered on October 10, 2016. On June 21, 2016, it was renewed for a fourth season which premiered on March 26, 2018. On May 22, 2018, it was renewed for a fifth season which premiered on August 16, 2019. On February 19, 2020, the series was renewed for a sixth season which premiered on December 18, 2020. On August 9, 2021, Charlie Adler, the voice director for the series, confirmed that the series was renewed for a seventh season, which was later confirmed to have 26 episodes.

Broadcast
Blaze and the Monster Machines premiered on Nick Jr. in the United Kingdom and Ireland on March 6, 2015 and on Nick Jr. in Australia and New Zealand on March 9. The series is also airing on Nickelodeon and Treehouse TV in Canada and Nick Jr. in Africa. It premiered on Nicktoons in the United Kingdom along with Ryan's Mystery Playdate on 6 January 2020.

DVD releases

Mobile streaming
On August 31, 2017, the first two seasons and the first half of the third season were added to the Noggin app.

Notes

See also

 Bigfoot Presents: Meteor and the Mighty Monster Trucks
 The Adventures of Chuck and Friends

References

External links
 
 

2010s American animated television series
2020s American animated television series
2010s American comic science fiction television series
2020s American comic science fiction television series
2010s Canadian animated television series
2020s Canadian animated television series
2010s Canadian comic science fiction television series
2020s Canadian comic science fiction television series
2010s Nickelodeon original programming
2020s Nickelodeon original programming
2014 American television series debuts
2014 Canadian television series debuts
American children's animated action television series
American children's animated adventure television series
American children's animated comic science fiction television series
American children's animated musical television series
American children's animated science fantasy television series
American children's animated sports television series
American computer-animated television series
American preschool education television series
Canadian children's animated action television series
Canadian children's animated adventure television series
Canadian children's animated comic science fiction television series
Canadian children's animated musical television series
Canadian children's animated science fantasy television series
Canadian children's animated sports television series
Canadian computer-animated television series
Canadian preschool education television series
Animated preschool education television series
2010s preschool education television series
2020s preschool education television series
English-language television shows
Nick Jr. original programming
Television series by DHX Media
Animated television series about auto racing